Sarai Alamgir is the main town of Sarai Alamgir Tehsil, located in the Gujrat district in the north of the Punjab province of Pakistan. Sarai Alamgir is one of four tehsils of Gujrat district.

East of the town is the Upper Jhelum Canal. Sarai Alamgir was raised to the level of Municipal Committee in 1976. After the implementation of Punjab Local Government Ordinance 2001, it was given the status of Tehsil Municipal Administration (TMA).

Geography and climate 
The municipality has a moderate climate. During the summer, temperatures can reach  for short periods. Winter months are mild, temperatures rarely falling below . Sarai Alamgir is located south of Jhelum City, which lies across the Jhelum River. To the north of Sarai, cities are Mirpure and Bhimber. Mandi Bahauddin and Rasul are located to the south of Sarai Alamgir.

History 
In ancient history, the region participated in the Indus Valley civilization and the Gandhara civilization. At a later date, the Battle of the Hydaspes took place nearby, between the armies of Alexander the Great and the Great King Porus.  In the past, people of influence would build a Sarai, which would be caravan stations and rest houses for travelers. A typical Sarai would consist of a drinking well, a praying area and a resting place for people.

The 'Sarai' (rest area) at Sarai Alamgir was founded by the Mughal emperor Aurangzeb because of its strategic location on the Grand Trunk Road and the Jhelum River, and its proximity to Kashmir. Over time, Sarai Alamgir developed into a central town for adjoining village populations.

Sarai Alamgir gained prominence when the King George V Royal Indian Military School was established on 3 March 1922; it was one of four such cadet schools in British India to benefit the sons of members of the Royal Indian Army. The college is now known as the Military College Jhelum and is one of the oldest institutions in Pakistan.

Administration 
The Tehsil Municipal Administration is a corporate body and consists of the Tehsil Nazim, Tehsil Municipal Officer, four Tehsil Officers and other officials of the Local Council Service, and officials of the offices entrusted to the Tehsil Municipal Administration. A Tehsil Nazim is the head of Tehsil Municipal Administration and exercises all functions and powers assigned to him under the Ordinance. The Tehsil Municipal Officer acts as coordinating and administrative officer, in charge of the Tehsil Officers.

Surrounding important places 
Sarai Alamgir is a historic crossroads between the ancient Grand Trunk Road and the Jhelum River. Nearby are the sites of the Battle of the Hydaspes, the historic and ancient Alexandrian city of Bukephala (or Bucephala) and the huge Rohtas Fort.

Boundaries 
Sarai Alamgir city has these cities in its surrounding areas:

West 
Jhelum

East 
Kharian

North 
Mirpur, Azad Kashmir

South 
Rasul

Union councils 
Sarai Alamgir Tehsil consists of nine union councils that, along with their respective populations in 1998, are:
     Mandi Bhalwal (109):     18,960
     Bhagnagar (113):         17,282
     Karyala (113):           20,531
     Simbli (114):            21,936
     Khohar (115):            32,486
     Sarai Alamgir-I (116):   17,271
     Sarai Alamgir-II (117):  19,895
     Thill Bakohal (110):     18,574
     Baisa (111):             20,353

Communications 
There are other transport links to the town, including a railway station, the Grand Trunk Road, the Jhelum River and the Upper Jhelum Canal. Sarai Alamgir is located on GT Road (N5) and Pakistan's main railway line. A highway connects it with Mandi Bahauddin, while the other one goes to Mirpur, Azad Kashmir. A Motorway interchange is also in the pipeline which will be completed by 2023.

References 

Cities in Punjab (Pakistan)
Populated places in Gujrat District